The Campeonato Nacional Copa Banco del Estado 1994, was the 62nd season of top-flight football in Chile. Universidad de Chile won their eight title following a 1–1 away tie at Cobresal on 18 December. Universidad Católica also qualified for the next Copa Libertadores as Liguilla winners.

Final table

Results

Topscorers

Liguilla Pre-Copa Libertadores

Universidad Católica also qualified for the 1995 Copa Libertadores

Copa CONMEBOL 1994 play-off

Universidad de Chile qualified for the 1994 Copa CONMEBOL

Promotion/relegation play-offs

Coquimbo Unido and Provincial Osorno stayed in the Primera División Chilena

See also
1994 Copa Chile

Notes

References
RSSSF Page
national-football-teams
Statistics

Primera División de Chile seasons
Chile
1994 in Chilean football